Aliceni may refer to several villages in Romania:

 Aliceni, a village in Poșta Câlnău Commune, Buzău County
 Aliceni, a village in Târșolț Commune, Satu Mare County